Mansa Nettey is a Ghanaian banking executive. She is the first female chief executive officer appointed by the Standard Chartered Bank of Ghana. The release of Mrs. Mansa Nettey succeeds Mr Kweku Bedu-Addo who has been appointed CEO, South Africa & Southern Africa, subject to relevant local approvals being received. The release quoted Bola Adesola as saying that: "I am delighted to welcome Mansa as the first female CEO for Standard Chartered Bank in Ghana. Her breadth of knowledge and deep insights of the market will further drive the growth of the Ghana business. I would like to thank Kweku for his leadership of the Ghana business over the last six years and wish him well in his new role". As part of her work, She will be reporting directly to Bola Adesola CEO, Nigeria and West Africa. She had her secondary school education at Achimota School before enrolling for an undergraduate degree at the Kwame Nkrumah University of Science and Technology where she came out as a pharmacist and her master's degree at the Manchester Business School 
Mrs. Nettey has over 19 years experience in the banking sector and she has held various senior roles in corporate and institutional banking.
She is on the board of directors at Standard Chartered Bank Nigeria Limited and on the Standard Chartered Bank Ghana Limited board as an executive director.
She is the founder of the Leukemia Project Foundation in Ghana. It was set up after she battled with leukemia for some years.

Education 
Mansa Nettey is an alumna of Achimota School and the Kwame Nkrumah University of Science and Technology in Ghana where she had her first degree. She then received her MBA at the Manchester Business School.

Career 
She started her banking career as the relationship manager of Standard Chartered Bank. She was the former head of foreign exchange sales in Ghana and across West Africa  She was also the head of the financial markets in Ghana  She is the executive director of the board of Standard Chartered Bank of Ghana and a non-executive director of the board of Standard Chartered Bank of Nigeria. In 2017, she was appointed the chief executive officer of Standard Chartered Bank, and that is her current role.

Awards and achievement 
Mrs. Nettey led a sales team in developing the financial market in Ghana  After battling with leukemia for some years, Mansa Nettey founded the Leukemia Project Foundation in Ghana.

References 

Living people
21st-century Ghanaian businesswomen
21st-century Ghanaian businesspeople
Kwame Nkrumah University of Science and Technology alumni
Alumni of the Manchester Business School
Year of birth missing (living people)